Venus Williams was the defending champion and successfully defended her title, by defeating Lindsay Davenport 7–5, 6–0 in the final to win her fourth title in a row. The final was a replay of the one played last year, in where Williams also won in two sets.

Seeds
The first four seeds received a bye into the second round.

Draw

Finals

Top half

Bottom half

References

External links
 Official results archive (WTA)

Pilot Pen Tennis
Connecticut Open (tennis)
2002 Pilot Pen Tennis